Saved from the Torrents is a 1911 silent film short produced by the Essanay Studios and released by the General Film Company. It was released in split-reel formant with another Essanay film Live, Love and Believe.

Cast
Francis X. Bushman - Arthur Chester
Dorothy Phillips - Katie Carrington
Bryant Washburn - Jack Carrington, Katie's Brother

See also
Francis X. Bushman filmography

References

External links
 Saved from the Torrents at IMDb.com

1911 films
American silent short films
Essanay Studios films
1911 short films
1910s American films